David Boyes Smith (19 November 1833 - 3 June 1889) was deputy surgeon general of the Indian Medical Service (IMS).

Early life
David Boyes Smith was born on 19 November 1833. He studied medicine at the University of Edinburgh, where he was president of the Royal Medical Society.

Career
Smith joined the Indian Medical Service in November 1855 and served during the Indian Mutiny. He was civil surgeon of Delhi, Mussoorie, Patna, Dacca, and Howrah, and became the first Sanitary Commissioner with the Government of Bengal in 1863.

He founded The Indian Medical Gazette in 1866 and afterwards was appointed principal of the Medical College, and First Physician in the Medical College Hospital, Calcutta. When he left India in 1885 he was elected professor of Military Medicine and Tropical Diseases, at the Army Medical School, Netley.

Personal and later life
Smith married after retirement. He had one daughter.

Death
Smith died on 3 June 1889 in Woolston, Southampton.

Not fulfilling the criteria for a military pension fund, Smith's friends set up a fund following his death, to help support his widow and daughter, the ‘David Boyes Smith Fund’.

Selected publications
Report on the Drainage and Conservancy of Calcutta, Sanitary Commission for Bengal, 1869.

References

External links 

1833 births
1889 deaths
Indian Medical Service officers
Sanitary commissioners
19th-century British medical doctors
Alumni of the University of Edinburgh